Nubra, also called Dumra, is a historical region of Ladakh, India that is currently administered as a subdivision and a tehsil in the Leh district. Its inhabited areas form a tri-armed valley cut by the Nubra and Shyok rivers. Its Tibetan name Dumra means "valley of flowers". Demands have been raised and BJP has hinted at creation of Nubra as a new district. Diskit, the headquarters of Nubra, is 120 km north of Leh, the capital of Ladakh.

The Shyok River meets the Nubra River (or Siachan River) to form a large valley that separates the Ladakh and Karakoram Ranges. The Shyok river is a tributary of the Indus river. The OST common way to access this valley is to travel over the Khardung La pass from Leh.

Foreign nationals are required to get a Protected area permit to visit Nubra. Since 1 April 2017 Indian citizens are also required to get an Inner Line Permit to visit it.

Name 
Nubra means "western" in Ladakhi, thus referring to the "western valley", perhaps distinguishing it from the thinly-populated eastern Shyok river valley. The traditional name of the region is Dumra, meaning "valley of flowers".

Geography 

Alexander Cunningham listed Nubra as one of the five natural and historical divisions of Ladakh. Nubra occupies the northeastern portion of Ladakh, bordering Baltistan and Chinese Turkestan in the north, and the Aksai Chin plateau and Tibet in the east. In Cunningham's conception, Nubra includes all the region drained by the Nubra and Shyok rivers. it is 128 miles long and 72 miles wide, making up an area of 9,200 square miles. It extends south till the Pangong Lake.

In modern nomenclature, the Nubra region is divided into "Diskit Nubra" in the north and the "Darbuk region" in the south, both of which are regarded as tehsils and subdivisions of the Leh district. The Diskit Nubra region includes the Turtuk block populated by Balti people, which became a part of Indian-administered Kashmir after the Indo-Pakistani War of 1971, and the unpopulated Siachen Glacier region.

The populated part of Nubra is often described as a "tri-armed valley",
the three arms being:
 the Nubra River Valley (divided into three sections called Yarma, Tśurka and Farka),
 Gyen, the upper Shyok valley from its southern bend till the confluence with the Nubra River, and
 Shama, the lower Shyok valley from the confluence till the Chorbat area.
The eastern Shyok valley is mostly unpopulated, even though it has numerous camping sites that have been used by trade caravans. Murgo is a village on the tributary called Murgo Nala.

Topography 

Like the rest of the Tibetan Plateau, Nubra is a high altitude cold desert with rare precipitation and scant vegetation except along river beds. The villages are irrigated and fertile, producing wheat, barley, peas, mustard and a variety of fruits and nuts, including blood apples, walnuts, apricots and even a few almond trees. Most of Nubra is inhabited by Nubra dialect or Nubra Skat speakers. The majority are Buddhists. In the western or lowest altitude end of Nubra near the Line of Control i.e. the Indo-Pak border, along the Shyok River, the inhabitants of Turtuk are Balti of Gilgit-Baltistan, who speak Balti, and are Shia and Sufia Nurbakhshia Muslims.

Siachen Glacier lies to the north of the valley. The Sasser Pass and the famous Karakoram Pass lie to the northwest of the valley and connect Nubra with Uyghur (Mandarin : Xinjiang). Previously much trade passed through the area towards western China's Xinjiang and Central Asia. The people of Baltistan also used the Nubra valley for passage to Tibet.

Places 

Diskit town in the valley have become the congregation centre for people of the region. Diskit is the headquarters of Nubra and thus has lot of government offices with basic facilities. It is also connected by road with Leh. 

Along the Nubra or Siachan River lie the villages of Sumur, Kyagar (called Tiger Hill by the Indian Army), Tirith, Panamik, Turtuk and many others.

Travel routes 

The main road access to Nubra is over Khardung La which is open throughout the year. The highest elevation of Khardung La is 5,359 m (17,582 ft), its status as the highest motorable road in the world is no longer accepted by most authorities. An alternative route, opened in 2008, crosses the Wari La from Sakti, to the east of Khardung La, connecting to the main Nubra road system via Agham and Khalsar along the Shyok River. There are also trekkable passes over the Ladakh Range from the Indus Valley at various points. Routes from Nubra to Baltistan and Yarkand, though historically important, have been closed since 1947 and 1950 respectively.

Tourism 

The Nubra valley was open for tourists up to Hunder (the land of sand dunes) until 2010. The region beyond Hunder gives way to a greener region of Ladakh because of its lower altitude. The village of Turtuk which was unseen by tourists till 2010 is a virgin destination for people who seek peace and an interaction with a tribal community of Ladakh. The local Balti people follow their age old customs in their lifestyle and speak a language which oral and not yet written. For tourists Turtuk offers serene camping sites with environment friendly infrastructure.

Panamik is noted for its hot springs. Between Hundar and Diskit lie seven kilometres of sand dunes, and (two-humped) Bactrian camels graze in the neighbouring "forests" of seabuckthorn. Non-locals are not allowed below Hundar village into the Balti area, as it is a border area.

Monasteries 

The 32-metre Maitreya Buddha statue is the landmark of Nubra and is maintained by the Diskit Monastery. On the Shyok River, the main village, Diskit, is home to the dramatically positioned Diskit Monastery which was built in 14th century. Hundar was the capital of the erstwhile Nubra kingdom in the 17th century, and is home to the Chamba Gompa. 

Samstanling Monastery is between Kyagar and Sumoor villages. Across the Nubra or Siachan River at Panamik, is the isolated Ensa Gompa .

Flora and fauna 

The valley is famous for its forest of Hippophae shrub, popularly known as Leh Berry. It is within this shrub forest that one can spot the white-browed tit-warbler. One can also spot the Tibetan lark, Hume's short-toed lark, and Hume's whitethroat. The various water birds like ruddy shelduck, garganey, northern pintail, and mallard can be observed on several small water bodies scattered along the route. Besides these, waders like black-tailed godwit, common sandpiper, common greenshank, common redshank, green sandpiper, and ruff can be spotted in Nubra.

Education 

The valley has been secluded as has been most of the exterior parts of Ladakh. Almost all of the region has been facing problems to get good quality education. There have been initiatives in the past by the government but extreme weather conditions and vicinity to the borders have been a major hurdle in implementing a solid education base. There is also migration of the population that gets exposed to the big cities of India and hence the people do not get benefitted out of their local learned population. There are very few Non-Government organizations active in Nubra region.

Gallery

See also 
 Ladakh
 Khardung La
 Siachen Glacier
 Thoise
 Chalunka
 Project HIMANK, road builders in the valley and creators of curious sign boards
 Disket

Notes

References

Bibliography

External links 

Valleys of Ladakh
Indus basin
Karakoram